Exodesis is a monotypic snout moth genus described by George Hampson in 1919. Its only species, E. vaterfieldi, described in the same article, is found in Sudan.

References

Endemic fauna of Sudan
Phycitinae
Monotypic moth genera
Moths of Africa